Shur Daraq, also rendered as Shordere or Shur Darreh, may refer to various places in Iran:
 Shur Daraq-e Olya, Ardabil Province
 Shur Daraq-e Sofla, Ardabil Province
 Shur Daraq, Hashtrud, East Azerbaijan Province
 Shur Daraq, Marand, East Azerbaijan Province